Neocatocha is a genus of wood midges, insects in the family Cecidomyiidae. The one described species - Neocatocha marilandica - has a holarctic distribution. The genus was established by American entomologist Ephraim Porter Felt in 1912.

References

Cecidomyiidae genera

Taxa named by Ephraim Porter Felt
Insects described in 1912
Monotypic Diptera genera